Stade J.F. Kennedy is a track and field stadium in Dudelange, in southern Luxembourg.  It is located in Burange, in the north of the city, and named after former U.S. President John F. Kennedy.  The stadium is the home of the athletics club CA Dudelange and the American Football Team " DUDELANGE STEELERS "

Athletics (track and field) venues in Luxembourg
Sports venues in Dudelange